Mount Pierre Elliott Trudeau is a  mountain located in the Premier Range of the Cariboo Mountains in the Interior of British Columbia, Canada.  The mountain is located on the south side of the McLennan River, just west of Valemount.

The name honours the fifteenth Prime Minister of Canada, Pierre Elliott Trudeau, who died in 2000. Upon Trudeau's death, then-Prime Minister Jean Chrétien floated the idea of renaming Mount Logan, Canada's highest peak, for Trudeau; when this met with resistance, this formerly unnamed peak was given the designation on June 10, 2006 in a ceremony held at Valemount and attended by Trudeau's eldest son, Justin.

References

External links
Photo of Mount Pierre Elliot Trudeau

Two-thousanders of British Columbia
Pierre Trudeau
Cariboo Mountains
Cariboo Land District